Gladys María Bejerano Portela (born January 7, 1947) is Vice President of the Council of State of Cuba, and serves as the Comptroller General of Cuba.

Bejerano Portela was promoted in 2006 as Minister of Audit and Control. Prior to that position, she was the Vice Minister of Auditing and Control under Lina Olinda Pedraza Rodríguez. Bejerano Portela has served as Comptroller General of Cuba since 2009 to 2019 succeeding Juan Almeida Bosque.

Bejerano Portela is also a member of the subcommittee of the Intosai Professional Standards Committee (PSC) that oversees International Standards of Supreme Audit Institutions (ISSAI) and INTOSAI Guidance for Good Governance (INTOSAI GOV). She holds a degree and licentiate (equivalent of Bachelor of Arts) in social sciences.

References

1947 births
21st-century Cuban women politicians
21st-century Cuban politicians
Communist Party of Cuba politicians
Government ministers of Cuba
Living people
Women government ministers of Cuba
Women vice presidents